When Love Comes to Town is an Australian dating reality television series that first aired on the Nine Network on 20 May 2014. The series is hosted by Natalie Gruzlewski, who previously also hosted a similar series The Farmer Wants a Wife.

Format
A group of city girls travel the country, stopping in regional areas to meet eligible bachelors. If the chemistry’s right, they can choose to stay on and pursue a relationship, otherwise it’s back on the bus and on to the next location.

The Single Ladies

The Bachelors

Results

Dates

Couples

Ratings

International broadcasting
Italy: It was broadcast in 2016 on Sky Uno,

References

Nine Network original programming
Australian dating and relationship reality television series
2014 Australian television series debuts
2014 Australian television series endings
English-language television shows